Lovčica-Trubín is a village and municipality in Žiar nad Hronom District in the Banská Bystrica Region of central Slovakia.

Villages and municipalities in Žiar nad Hronom District